Barney Kulok (born New York, United States, 1981) is an American artist and photographer who lives and works in New York City. Kulok earned a Bachelor of Arts from Bard College in 2005. His work has been exhibited nationally and internationally at the Nicole Klagsbrun Gallery (New York), Wentrup Gallery (Berlin), Elizabeth Kaufmann Galerie and de Pury & Luxembourg (Zurich), Shinsegae Gallery (Seoul, Incheon, Busan), and Galerie Hussenot (Paris), where he is represented.

Following the New York debut of his collaborative video installation in Walls 'N' Things, a group exhibition of young artists curated by Clarissa Dalrymple at the Nicole Klagsbrun Gallery in 2005, Kulok was identified as one of the ten "23-Year-old Masters" by The Wall Street Journal. In that article artist Joel Sternfeld is quoted as introducing Kulok as a "young Mozart." The New Yorker magazine called his 2007 solo exhibition "a cunning and memorable debut," and critic Vince Aletti wrote "Working in a black-and-white and color and in a wide range of scales, Kulok turns out extremely self-conscious pictures of mostly ordinary things: bouquets of fake flowers in a car's rear window, doorbells in a tenement foyer, a stained leatherette headrest, a wind-blown tree at night, a barn. But each of these images is tight, engaging an surprisingly elegant; the headrest is close to perfection."  Publications of Kulok’s work have included essays by architect Steven Holl, filmmaker Nathaniel Kahn, curator Joel Smith (The Morgan Library & Museum), and art historians Svetlana Alpers (Professor Emerita, UC Berkeley) and Laurie Dahlberg (Bard College). His work has been reviewed and/or featured in The New York Times, The Wall Street Journal, The New Yorker, Artforum, Frieze, Bomb Magazine, Art Papers, Dossier, Aperture Magazine and Time Out NY, among others. A recipient of the Lower Manhattan Cultural Council’s MCAF Grant, he has lectured at the New York Institute for the Humanities (New York University), Harvard University, Sarah Lawrence College, The University of Texas at Austin and the School of Visual Arts. Kulok’s work is in many private collections and in the permanent collections of the Museum of Modern Art, NY, The Frances Lehman Loeb Art Center, and the Cleveland Clinic.

In 2012 Aperture Foundation published Kulok’s first monograph, Building: Louis I. Kahn at Roosevelt Island, which was chosen as one of the Best Books of 2012 and described as “a poem in concrete, brick and rebar” by Photo Eye. Writing about Building for Frieze critic Chris Wiley observed, the “stunningly rich black-and-white photographs” “take into account the art historical precedents of Minimalism and Post-Minimalism, with a deftness that has had few parallels since the work of Lewis Baltz.” In its review of the exhibition Building at the Nicole Klagsbrun Gallery, Artforum called the “moody gelatin silver prints” “quietly thrilling,” and Art Papers wrote that Kulok has given architect Louis Kahn “the posthumous interpreter – clear-eyed, historically minded, informed but independent – that he deserves.”

In 2013 Kulok was commissioned by Brian Sholis, then editor of Aperture magazine, to write Reflections on the Concrete Mirror, an essay about the relationship between photography and architecture. In 2014 Kulok co-edited, with artist Vik Muniz, the 20th Anniversary issue of Blind Spot Magazine. In 2016 Kulok founded Hunters Point Press in Long Island City, NY where he has published books by Baldwin Lee, B. Wurtz, Jeremy Sigler, Janice Guy, and Jared Bark.

Exhibitions
2015
 Galerie Eric Hussenot, Paris, France
 C.Ar.D. II, Organized by Paolo Baldacci and Daniela Volpi. Palazzo Farnese, Piacenza, Italy. 
2014
 C.Ar.D., Organized by Paolo Baldacci and Daniela Volpi. Bocciodromo, Pianello, Italy. 
 Soft Target, Curated by Matt Porter & Phil Chang, M+B Gallery, Los Angeles. 
 Staring at The Sun, Curated by Jodie Vicenta Jacobson, Blind Spot/Griffin Editions Project Space, Brooklyn NY.
2013
 Building, Shinsegae Gallery, Seoul (Incheon, Busan), Korea
 Come Together : Surviving Sandy, Curated by Phong Bui, Industry City, Brooklyn, NY.
 Building Material, Curated by Lucas Blalock and James Hyde, Real Art Ways, Hartford, CT. 
 Dust Breeding, Churner and Churner. New York, NY
 Traces of Life, Curated by Ariel-Roger Paris. Wentrup Gallery, Berlin, Germany. 
 Room For Myth, Curated by Mark Shortliffe. Dodge Gallery, New York NY.
2012
 Building Material, Organized by Lucas Blalock. Control Room, Los Angeles, CA.
 Letters From Home, Ochi Gallery, Ketchum, ID.
 Too Old for Toys, Too Young for Boys, Curated by Alex Gartenfeld. OHWOW Gallery, Los Angeles, CA 
 Brand Innovations for Ubiquitous Authorship, Curated by Artie Vierkant. Higher Pictures, NY.
 Building, Nicole Klagsbrun Gallery, New York, NY 
2011
 11.11.11, Galerie Hussenot, Paris, France
 Enclosure, Curated by Janaina Tschäpe. Roos Arts, Rosendale, NY
2010
 Photographies, Galerie Hussenot, Paris, France
 Redi-Mix, Curated by James Hyde, Kathleen-Cullen Fine Art, New York, NY
2009
 In Visible Cities, Nicole Klagsbrun Gallery, New York, NY
 Better History, presented by The American Standard Gallery, 7Eleven Gallery & O.H.W.O.W, New York, NY
2008
 Galerie Hussenot, Paris, France
 to: Night: Contemporary Representations of the Night, The Hunter College Art Galleries: The Bertha and Karl Leubsdorf Art Gallery & Times Square Gallery, NY, New York, Curated by Joachim Pissaro, Mara Hoberman, & Julia Moreno 
 Seeing Double : James Hyde and Barney Kulok, Galerie Elisabeth Kaufmann, Zürich, Switzerland 
 Paradise Lost, Seven Eleven Gallery, New York, NY. 
2007
 Simple Facts, Nicole Klagsbrun Gallery, New York, NY
 Painting Then For Now, David Krut Projects, New York (in collaboration with Svetlana Alpers and James Hyde)
 Season’s Greetings: Contemporary Photography, de Pury & Luxembourg, Zürich, Switzerland
2006
 Clarissa Dalrymple’s Exhibition of Young Artists to Benefit the Foundation for Contemporary Arts, Bortolami Dayan Gallery, New York, NY
2005
 Walls N’ Things, (collaboration with Sebastian Bear-McClard), Curated by Clarissa Dalrymple. Nicole Klagsbrun Gallery, New York, NY 
 In Good Company, Organized by Heige Kim, New York, NY 
 Emerging Artist Showcase, Heimbold Visual Arts Center, Sarah Lawrence College, Bronxville, NY (invited by Joel Sternfeld)
2004
 Woods Studio, Bard College, Annandale-on-Hudson, NY

References

1981 births
Bard College alumni
Living people
American photographers